Parque Patricios Station is a station on Line H of the Buenos Aires Underground. It was inaugurated on 4 October 2011 as the southern terminus of one-station extension from Caseros. It remained the terminus of the line until 27 May 2013, when the line was extended to Hospitales.

References

External links 

Buenos Aires Underground stations
Railway stations opened in 2011
2011 establishments in Argentina